Clarence Scott Beers (December 9, 1918 – December 6, 2002), was a Major League Baseball pitcher who played in  with the St. Louis Cardinals. He batted and threw right-handed.

External links

Retrosheet

1918 births
2002 deaths
People from El Dorado, Kansas
Asheville Tourists players
Baseball players from Kansas
Beaumont Exporters players
Beaumont Roughnecks players
Charleston Senators players
Columbus Red Birds players
Hobbs Drillers players
Houston Buffaloes players
Lincoln Chiefs players
Major League Baseball pitchers
Midland Cardinals players
Paris Indians players
Pocatello Cardinals players
Sabios de Vargas players
St. Louis Cardinals players
Sacramento Solons players
Seattle Rainiers players
Toledo Mud Hens players